Tampa, the third-largest city in the U.S. state of Florida, is home to 168 completed high-rises, 34 of which stand taller than . The tallest building in Tampa is the 42-story 100 North Tampa, which rises  and was completed in 1992. The structure is the twenty ninth-tallest completed building in Florida and the tallest building in the state outside of Miami and Jacksonville. The building was damaged in a 2002 plane crash, in which a young pilot stole and crashed a Cessna 172 into the building's north face. Overall, of the 30 tallest buildings in Florida, two are located in Tampa.

Background

History 
The history of skyscrapers in Tampa began with the completion of the Citizens Bank Building in 1913; this building is often regarded as the first high-rise in the city, rising 10 stories. Later in the 1920s, two more stories were added to reach  in height. The city's first skyscraper to surpass  was the  Franklin Exchange Building, completed in 1966. Tampa went through a large high-rise construction boom that has lasted from the completion of One Tampa City Center in 1981 to the present; during this time, the city has seen the completion of 16 of its 18 tallest buildings, including 100 North Tampa and the Bank of America Plaza. , Tampa ranks second in the state in skyscraper count, behind Miami, which is the site of 298 skyscrapers.

Present 
Tampa's skyscraper construction has continued to the present; since 2000, twenty buildings rising higher than  have been completed. The latest, Tampa EDITION Hotel & Residences, rises  in height and was completed in 2022. Tampa EDITION Hotel & Residences stands as the forthteenth-tallest building in Tampa, behind the  Tampa Marriott Water Street. As of May 2022, there are 20 high-rises under construction, approved, and proposed for construction in the city.

Water Street Tampa 
Water Street Tampa, the 3 Billion Dollar Project, that will transform Tampa's skyline. Water Street Tampa is a massive mixed-use Tampa Bay Lightning owner, Jeffrey Vinik, has envisioned for years. The project was developed by Strategic Property Partners, LLC, a joint venture of Cascade Investment, owned by Bill Gates, the Microsoft co-founder, and Jeffrey Vinik. More than 50 acres of downtown Tampa will consist of Water Street Tampa. It will create 2.2 million square feet of new office space; approximately 3,500 new rental and for-sale residences; 1 million square feet of new retail, cultural, educational, and entertainment space at the street-level, as well as 12.9 acres of new and enhanced park and public gathering places. Two new hotels, JW Marriott (four-star hotel) and EDITION Marriott (Tampa's first five-star hotel) will boost over 650 new rooms. A $40 million renovation is also planned at the existing Marriott Waterside hotel. Tampa's hockey arena, Amalie Arena, will be surrounded by tons of construction cranes at a time, with nearly 3,000 hard hats on the job. Water Street Tampa will be one of the largest downtown real estate developments in the United States. Water Street Tampa is expected to be divided into 3 phases. The largest phase, 1, is scheduled to be completed in 2022, while the last phase, 3, is set to be completed in 2027.

Tallest buildings
This list ranks Tampa skyscrapers that stand at least 250 feet (76 m) tall, based on standard height measurement. This includes spires and architectural details but does not include antenna masts. An equal sign (=) following a rank indicates the same height between two or more buildings. The "Year" column indicates the year in which a building was completed.

Timeline of tallest buildings 

This lists buildings that once held the title of the tallest building in Tampa.

Tallest approved, under construction, or proposed 
This lists buildings that are under construction, approved, or proposed to rise at least 200 feet. The "Year" column represents the estimated year the structure is set for completion.

Approved 
This lists buildings that are currently approved in Tampa and are planned to rise at least 200 feet.

Under construction 
This lists buildings that are currently under construction in Tampa and are planned to rise at least 200 feet.

Proposed 
This lists buildings that are currently proposed in Tampa and are planned to rise at least 200 feet.

* Table entries with dashes (—) indicate that information regarding building heights, floor counts, or dates of completion has not yet been released.

See also 

 List of tallest buildings in Florida
 List of tallest buildings in Fort Lauderdale
 List of tallest buildings in Jacksonville
 List of tallest buildings in Miami
 List of tallest buildings in Miami Beach
 List of tallest buildings in Orlando
 List of tallest buildings in St. Petersburg
 List of tallest buildings in Sunny Isles Beach

References

External links
 Diagram of Tampa skyscrapers on SkyscraperPage
 Florida High-Rises at urbanFLORIDA

 
Tampa
Tallest, Tampa
Tallest